Welsh pop and rock music is popular music of Wales produced commercially in Wales.

History

20th century

1960s 
Tom Jones and Shirley Bassey dominated Welsh pop in the 60s. Bassey released her debut single, The Banana Boat Song in 1957 and in October 1964 released the James Bond film theme song, Goldfinger. In February 1965, Tom Jones released the hit single, It's Not Unusual, the start of his long career. Meic Stevens established himself in the 60s and the record label Sain was founded in 1969 in Cardiff by Dafydd Iwan and Huw Jones. The record label rapidly became the leading record company of Wales.

Popular artists 
 Tom Jones
 Shirley Bassey
 Ricky Valance
 John Cale
 Amen Corner
 Bad Finger
 Mary Hopkin
 Man
 Meic Stevens

1970s 
Tom Jones and Shirley Bassey continued their successful careers with Bassey releasing Diamonds Are Forever in 1972 and Jones releasing Daughter Of Darkness, I (Who Have Nothing), She's A Lady. Max Boyce established himself in the 70s and in 1973 he recorded the album Live At Treorchy (rugby club). Meic Stevens released his single Y Brawd Houdini, Edward H. Dafis became a popular rock group and Geraint Jarman's reggae inspired music became popular in Wales.

Popular artists 
Tom Jones
 Shirley Bassey
 Max Boyce
 Man
 Budgie
 Bad Finger
 Meic Stevens
 John Cale
 Edward H. Dafis

1980s artists 

 Young Marble Giants
 Super Furry Animals
 Shakin' Stevens
 Bonnie Tyler
 Yr Anhrefn
 Datblygu
 Llwybr Llaethog
 John Cale
 Tom Jones

1990s artists 

 Manic Street Preachers
 Stereophonics
 Catatonia (band)
 Super Furry Animals
 Big Leaves
 Y Cyrff
 Tom Jones

21st century

2010s artists 

 Lostprophets
 Funeral for a Friend
 Bullet for My Valentine
 Goldie Lookin Chain
 Duffy
 Charlotte Church
 Feeder (band)

2020s artists 

 Tom Jones
 Stereophonics
 Catfish and the Bottlemen
 Super Fury Animals
 Dafydd Iwan
 Candelas
 Swnami
 Yws Gwynedd

See also
 Cool Cymru
 List of Welsh musicians
 Welsh Language Music Day

References 

pop and rock
British popular music
British rock music